The 1994 Tour of the Basque Country was the 34th edition of the Tour of the Basque Country cycle race and was held from 4 April to 8 April 1994. The race started in Mondragón and finished in Elosiaga. The race was won by Tony Rominger of the Mapei team.

General classification

References

1994
Bas